Thuận An may refer to several places in Vietnam, including:

Thuận An, a district-level town of Bình Dương Province
Thuận An, Cần Thơ, a ward of Thốt Nốt District
Thuận An, Hậu Giang, a ward of Long Mỹ
Thuận An, Thừa Thiên Huế, a ward of Huế
Thuận An, Vĩnh Long, a commune of Bình Minh
Thuận An, Đắk Nông, a commune of Đắk Mil District